Janus Bey, in Turkish Yunus Bey (born in Modon at the end of the 15th century; died 1541/42) was a Greek who became an interpreter (dragoman) and ambassador for the Ottoman Empire.

In 1532 he visited Venice and had meetings with the Venetian government. He was considered as the ambassador for the Ottoman Empire, was well received, and was the beneficiary of large presents from the Venetians. In 1532, he apparently worked with French ambassador Antonio Rincon to obtain a safe-conduct for the Ottoman embassy to France (1533). In 1537 he was co-author with Alvise Gritti of an Italian booklet, published in Venice, on the government of the Ottoman Empire. The title was Opera noua la quale dechiara tutto il gouerno del gran Turcho. He founded a mosque in Constantinople, called the "Dragoman's Mosque" (Durughman Mesjidi). He died in 1541/42.

See also
 Franco-Ottoman alliance

Notes

References
 Garnier, Edith L'Alliance Impie Editions du Felin, 2008, Paris  Interview
 Krstić, Tijana "Of Translation and Empire: sixteenth-century Ottoman imperial interpreters as Renaissance go-betweens" in Christine Woodhead, The Ottoman World (Abingdon: Routledge, 2011) pp. 130-142, especially 132-134 Preview at Google Books

1541 deaths
16th-century people from the Ottoman Empire
16th-century diplomats
Ambassadors of the Ottoman Empire
Ambassadors to the Republic of Venice
Greeks from the Ottoman Empire
16th-century Greek people
Dragomans
People from Messenia